Parliamentary elections were held in Vietnam on 26 April 1981. The Vietnamese Fatherland Front was the only party to contest the election and nominated forward 614 candidates for the 496 seats. Voter turnout was reported to be 98%.

Results

References

Vietnam
Elections in Vietnam
1981 in Vietnam
One-party elections
Election and referendum articles with incomplete results